Ānāpānasati (Pali; Sanskrit ānāpānasmṛti), meaning "mindfulness of breathing" ("sati" means mindfulness; "ānāpāna" refers to inhalation and exhalation), paying attention to the breath. It is the quintessential form of Buddhist meditation, attributed to Gautama Buddha, and described in several suttas, most notably the Ānāpānasati Sutta (MN 118).

Derivations of anāpānasati are common to Tibetan, Zen, Tiantai and Theravada Buddhism as well as Western-based mindfulness programs.

Contemplation of bodily phenomena 
The Anapanasati Sutta prescribes mindfulness of inhalation and exhalation as element of mindfulness of the body, and recommends the practice of mindfulness of breathing as a means of cultivating the seven factors of awakening, which is an alternative formulation or description of the process of dhyana: sati (mindfulness), dhamma vicaya (analysis), viriya (persistence), pīti (rapture), passaddhi (serenity), samadhi (unification of mind) upekkhā (equanimity). According to this and other sutras, the development of these factors leads to release (Pali: vimutti; Sanskrit mokṣa) from dukkha (suffering) and the attainment of nirvana.

Derivations of anapanasati are a core meditation practice in Theravada, Tiantai and Chan traditions of Buddhism as well as a part of many mindfulness programs. According to Anālayo, in both ancient and modern times anapanasati by itself is likely the most widely used Buddhist method for contemplating bodily phenomena.

The practice

Anapanasati sutta

The mindfullness practice described in the Anapanasati Sutra is to go into the forest and sit beneath a tree and then to simply watch the breath:

While inhaling and exhaling, the meditator practises:
training the mind to be sensitive to one or more of: the entire body, rapture, pleasure, the mind itself, and mental processes
training the mind to be focused on one or more of: inconstancy, dispassion, cessation, and relinquishment
steadying, satisfying, or releasing the mind.

If it is pursued and well developed, it is said to bring great benefit," aiding to the development of mindfullness as one of the factors of awakening:

Post-canonical development

A popular post-canonical method still used today, follows four stages:

 Repeatedly counting exhalations in cycles of 10
 Repeatedly counting inhalations in cycles of 10
 Focusing on the breath without counting
 Focusing only on the spot where the breath enters and leaves the nostrils (i.e., the nostril and upper lip area).

Counting the breath is attributed by the Theravada tradition to Buddhaghosa's commentary the Visuddhimagga, but Vasubandhu's Abhidharmakośakārikā also teaches the counting of breaths to ten. The dhyāna sutras, based on Sarvastivada practices, and translated into Chinese by An Shigao, also recommands counting the breath, and forms the basis of Zen practices. In the dhyana sutras his is organized into a teaching called "the six aspects" or "the six means" which according to Florin Deleanu:

Modern sources
Traditional anapanasati teaches to observe inhalation and exhalation by focusing on the air coming in and out the nostrils, but followers of the Burmese Vipassana movement instead recommend focusing on the abdomen's movement during the act of breathing. Other Buddhist schools also teach it as an alternative point of focus.

According to John Dunne, for the practice to be successful, one should dedicate the practice, and set out the goal of the meditation session. According to Philip Kapleau, in Zen practice one may decide to either practice anapanasati while seated or standing or lying down or walking, or to alternate seated, standing, lying down and walking meditation. Then one may concentrate on the breath going through one's nose: the pressure in the nostrils on each inhalation, and the feeling of the breath moving along the upper lip on each exhalation. Other times practitioners are advised to attend to the breath at the tanden, a point slightly below the navel and beneath the surface of the body. Practitioners may choose to count each inhalation, "1, 2, 3,..." and so on, up to 10, and then begin from 1 again. Alternatively people sometimes count the exhalation, "1, 2, 3,...," on both the inhalation and exhalation. If the count is lost then one should start again from the beginning.

The type of practice recommended in The Three Pillars of Zen is for one to count "1, 2, 3,..." on the inhalation for a while, then to eventually switch to counting on the exhalation, then eventually, once one has more consistent success in keeping track of the count, to begin to pay attention to the breath without counting. There are practitioners who count the breath all their lives as well. Beginning students are often advised to keep a brief daily practice of around 10 or 15 minutes a day. Also, a teacher or guide of some sort is often considered to be essential in Buddhist practice, as well as the sangha, or community of Buddhists, for support.

When one becomes distracted from the breath, which happens to both beginning and adept practitioners, either by a thought or something else, then one simply returns their attention back to the breath. Philippe Goldin has said that important "learning" occurs at the moment when practitioners turn their attention back to the object of focus, the breath.

Active breathing, passive breathing

Anapanasati is most commonly practiced with attention centered on the breath, without any effort to change the breathing.

In the throat singing prevalent amongst the Buddhist monks of Tibet and Mongolia the long and slow outbreath during chanting is the core of the practice. The sound of the chant also serves to focus the mind in one-pointed concentration samadhi, while the sense of self dissolves as awareness becomes absorbed into a realm of pure sound.

In some Japanese Zen meditation, the emphasis is upon maintaining "strength in the abdominal area" (dantian or "tanden") and slow deep breathing during the long outbreath, again to assist the attainment of a mental state of one-pointed concentration. There is also a "bamboo method," during which time one inhales and exhales in punctuated bits, as if running one's hand along the stalk of a bamboo tree.

Pranayama, or Yogic breath control, is very popular in traditional and modern forms of Yoga.

Scientifically demonstrated benefits

The practice of focusing one's attention changes the brain in ways to improve that ability over time; the brain grows in response to meditation. Meditation can be thought of as mental training, similar to learning to ride a bike or play a piano.

Meditators experienced in focused attention meditation (anapanasati is a type of focused attention meditation) showed a decrease in habitual responding a 20-minute Stroop test, which, as suggested by Richard Davidson and colleagues, may illustrate a lessening of emotionally reactive and automatic responding behavior.  It has been scientifically demonstrated that ānāpānasati enhances connectivity in the brain.

In the Theravada tradition

Abbidhamma 
The Abbidhamma literature discerns sixteen stages – or contemplations – of anapanasati. These are divided into four tetrads (i.e., sets or groups of four). The first four steps involve focusing the mind on breathing, which is the 'body-conditioner' (Pali: kāya-sankhāra). The second tetrad involves focusing on the feelings (vedanā), which are the 'mind-conditioner' (Pali: citta-sankhāra). The third tetrad involves focusing on the mind itself (Pali: citta), and the fourth on 'mental qualities' (Pali: dhamma).  (Compare right mindfulness and satipatthana.)

Any anapanasati meditation session should progress through the stages in order, beginning at the first, whether the practitioner has performed all stages in a previous session or not.

Contemporary interpretations
According to several teachers in Theravada Buddhism, anapanasati alone will lead to the removal of all one's defilements (kilesa) and eventually to enlightenment. According to Roger Bischof, the Ven. Webu Sayadaw said of anapanasati: "This is a shortcut to Nirvana, anyone can use it. It stands up to investigation and is in accordance with the teachings of the Buddha as conserved in the scriptures. It is the straight path to Nirvana."

Anapanasati can also be practised with other traditional meditation subjects including the four frames of reference and mettā bhāvanā, as is done in modern Theravadan Buddhism.

In the Chinese tradition

In the second century, the Buddhist monk An Shigao came from Northwest India to China and became one of the first translators of Buddhist scriptures into Chinese. He translated a version of the Ānāpānasmṛti Sūtra between 148 and 170 CE. Though once believed to have been lost, the original translation was rediscovered at Amanosan Kongoji, Osaka, Japan, by Professor Ochiai Toshinori in 1999. Its commentary, on the other hand, is a significantly longer text than what appears in the Ekottara Āgama, and is entitled, "The Great Ānāpānasmṛti Sūtra" (Ch. 大安般守意經) (Taishō Tripiṭaka 602).

At a later date, Buddhacinga, more commonly known as Fotudeng (佛圖澄) (231-349 CE), came from Central Asia to China in 310 and propagated Buddhism widely. He is said to have demonstrated many spiritual powers, and was able to convert the warlords in this region of China over to Buddhism. He is well known for teaching methods of meditation, and especially ānāpānasmṛti. Fotudeng widely taught ānāpānasmṛti through methods of counting breaths, so as to temper to the breathing, simultaneously focusing the mind into a state of peaceful meditative concentration. By teaching meditation methods as well as doctrine, Fotudeng popularized Buddhism quickly. According to Nan Huaijin, "Besides all its theoretical accounts of emptiness and existence, Buddhism also offered methods for genuine realization of spiritual powers and meditative concentration that could be relied upon. This is the reason that Buddhism began to develop so vigorously in China with Fotudeng."

As more monks such as Kumārajīva, Dharmanandi, Gautama Saṃghadeva, and Buddhabhadra came to the East, translations of meditation texts did as well, which often taught various methods of ānāpānasmṛti that were being used in India. These became integrated in various Buddhist traditions, as well as into non-Buddhist traditions such as Daoism.

In the sixth century, the Tiantai school was formed, teaching the One Vehicle (Skt. Ekayāna), the vehicle of attaining Buddhahood, as the main principle, and three forms of śamatha-vipaśyanā correlated with the meditative perspectives of emptiness, provisional existence, and the mean, as the method of cultivating realization. The Tiantai school places emphasis on ānāpānasmṛti in accordance with the principles of śamatha and vipaśyanā. In China, the Tiantai understanding of meditation has had the reputation of being the most systematic and comprehensive of all. The founder of the Tiantai school, Zhiyi, wrote many commentaries and treatises on meditation. Of these texts, Zhiyi's Concise Śamatha-vipaśyanā (小止観 Xiǎo Zhǐguān), his Mahāśamatha Vipaśyanā (摩訶止観 Móhē Zhǐguān), and his Six Subtle Dharma Gates (六妙法門 Liù Miào Fǎmén) are the most widely read in China. Zhiyi classifies breathing into four main categories: panting (喘 "chuǎn"), unhurried breathing (風 "fēng"), deep and quiet breathing (氣 "qì"), and stillness or rest (息 "xi"). Zhiyi holds that the first three kinds of breathing are incorrect, while the fourth is correct, and that the breathing should reach stillness and rest. Venerable Hsuan Hua, who taught Chan and Pure Land Buddhism, also taught that the external breathing reaches a state of stillness in correct meditation:

In the Indo-Tibetan tradition
In the Tibetan Buddhist lineage, ānāpānasmṛti is done to calm the mind in order to prepare one for various other practices.

Two of the most important Mahāyāna philosophers, Asaṅga and Vasubandhu, in the Śrāvakabhūmi chapter of the Yogācārabhūmi-śāstra and the Abhidharma-kośa, respectively, make it clear that they consider ānāpānasmṛti a profound practice leading to vipaśyanā (in accordance with the teachings of the Buddha in the Sutra pitika). However, as scholar Leah Zahler has demonstrated, "the practice traditions related to Vasubandhu's or Asaṅga's presentations of breath meditation were probably not transmitted to Tibet." Asaṅga correlates the sixteen stages of ānāpānasmṛti with the four smṛtyupasthānas in the same way that the Ānāpānasmṛti Sutra does, but because he does not make this explicit the point was lost on later Tibetan commentators.

As a result, the largest Tibetan lineage, the Gelug, came to view ānāpānasmṛti as a mere preparatory practice useful for settling the mind but nothing more. Zahler writes:

Zahler continues,

Stephen Batchelor, who for years was monk in the Gelukpa lineage, experienced this firsthand. He writes, "such systematic practice of mindfulness was not preserved in the Tibetan traditions. The Gelugpa lamas know about such methods and can point to long descriptions of mindfulness in their Abhidharma works, but the living application of the practice has largely been lost. (Only in dzog-chen, with the idea of 'awareness' [rig pa] do we find something similar.) For many Tibetans the very term 'mindfulness' (sati in Pali, rendered in Tibetan by dran pa) has come to be understood almost exclusively as 'memory' or 'recollection.'"

As Batchelor noted, however, in other traditions, particularly the Kagyu and Nyingma, mindfulness based on ānāpānasmṛti practice is considered to be quite profound means of calming the mind to prepare it for the higher practices of Dzogchen and Mahamudra. For the Kagyupa, in the context of mahāmudrā, ānāpānasmṛti is thought to be the ideal way for the meditator to transition into taking the mind itself as the object of meditation and generating vipaśyanā on that basis. The prominent contemporary Kagyu/Nyingma master Chogyam Trungpa, echoing the Kagyu Mahāmudrā view, wrote, "your breathing is the closest you can come to a picture of your mind. It is the portrait of your mind in some sense. . .The traditional recommendation in the lineage of meditators that developed in the Kagyu-Nyingma tradition is based on the idea of mixing mind and breath." The Gelukpa allow that it is possible to take the mind itself as the object of meditation, however, Zahler reports, the Gelukpa discourage it with "what seems to be thinly disguised sectarian polemics against the Nyingma Great Completeness [Dzogchen] and Kagyu Great Seal [mahāmudrā] meditations."

In the Pañcakrama tantric tradition ascribed to (the Vajrayana) Nagarjuna, ānāpānasmṛti counting breaths is said to be sufficient to provoke an experience of vipaśyanā (although it occurs in the context of "formal tantric practice of the completion stage in highest yogatantra").

International Anapanasatti Day 
Many countries are following 20 June to celebrate Anapanasatti day world wide.

See also 
 Anussati
 Buddhanussati
 Buddhist meditation
 Jarāmaraṇa
 Patikulamanasikara
 Samatha-vipassana
 Xingqi (circulating breath)
 Zazen

Notes

References

Bibliography
 
 
 
 Kamalashila (1996; 2004 [2nd ed.]). Meditation: The Buddhist Way of Tranquillity and Insight. Birmingham: Windhorse Publications. .

Primary sources 
 Thanissaro Bhikkhu (trans.) (1995a). Ananda Sutta: To Ananda (On Mindfulness of Breathing) (SN 54.13). Retrieved on 2007-05-20 from "Access to Insight" at: http://www.accesstoinsight.org/tipitaka/sn/sn54/sn54.013.than.html.
 Thanissaro Bhikkhu (trans.) (1995b). Satipatthana Sutta: Frames of Reference (MN 10). Retrieved on 2007-05-20 from "Access to Insight" at: http://www.accesstoinsight.org/tipitaka/mn/mn.010.than.html.
 Thanissaro Bhikkhu (trans.) (1997). Kayagata-sati Sutta: Mindfulness Immersed in the Body (MN 119). Retrieved on 2007-05-20 from "Access to Insight" at: http://www.accesstoinsight.org/tipitaka/mn/mn.119.than.html.
 Thanissaro Bhikkhu (trans.) (2000). Maha-satipatthana Sutta: The Great Frames of Reference (DN 22). Retrieved on 2007-05-20 from "Access to Insight: Readings in Theravada Buddhism," at http://www.accesstoinsight.org/tipitaka/dn/dn.22.0.than.html.
 Thanissaro Bhikkhu (trans.) (2006a). Arittha Sutta: To Arittha (On Mindfulness of Breathing) (SN 54.6). Retrieved on 2007-05-20 from "Access to Insight" at: http://www.accesstoinsight.org/tipitaka/sn/sn54/sn54.006.than.html.
 Thanissaro Bhikkhu (trans.) (2006b). Dipa Sutta: The Lamp (SN 54.8). Retrieved on 2007-05-20 from "Access to Insight" at: http://www.accesstoinsight.org/tipitaka/sn/sn54/sn54.008.than.html.

Further reading 
 Mindfulness with Breathing by Buddhadāsa Bhikkhu. Wisdom Publications, Boston, 1996. .
 Breath by Breath by Larry Rosenberg. Shambhala Classics, Boston, 1998. .
 Tranquillity and Insight by Amadeo Sole-Leris. Shambhala, 1986. .
 "The Anapanasati Sutta / A Practical Guide to Mindfulness of Breathing and Tranquil Wisdom Meditation" by Bhante Vimalaramsi. Yin Shun Foundation, January 1999; First edition (1999). ASIN: B00183T9XW
 Breathing Like a Buddha by Ajahn Sucitto. Amaravati Publications, 2022. .

External links 

 Ekottara Āgama 17.1: The Ānāpānasmṛti Sūtra
 Analysis of the Ānāpānasati Sutta
 Ānāpānasati, a free e-book by Buddhadasa
 Ānāpānasati – Mindfulness with Breathing: Unveiling the Secrets of Life, by Buddhadasa
 Ānāpānasati instructions, by Bhante Vimalaramsi
 Ānāpānasati: A concise instruction, by Pa Auk Sayadaw
 Basic Breath Meditation Instructions by Thanissaro Bhikkhu
 Mindfulness of Breathing: A Practice Guide and Translations, by Bhikkhu Analayo
 Anapanasati: Mindfulness of In-and-Out Breathing, by Ajahn Pasanno

Pali words and phrases
Buddhist meditation
Theravada
Mindfulness (Buddhism)